The Computational Brain is a book by Patricia Churchland and Terrence J. Sejnowski and published in 1992 by The MIT Press, Cambridge, Massachusetts, .  It has cover blurbs by Karl Pribram, Francis Crick, and Carver Mead.

References

Science books